Lambda Pi Chi Sorority, Incorporated (also known as Latinas Promoviendo Comunidad/Lambda Pi Chi Sorority, Inc.) is a Latina-based, but not Latina-exclusive Greek letter intercollegiate sorority founded on April 16, 1988, at Cornell University by five women.

The organization is a member of the National Association of Latino Fraternal Organizations (NALFO).

History
Latinas Promoviendo Comunidad/Lambda Pi Chi Sorority, Inc. was established on April 16, 1988, at Cornell University by Patricia Rivera, Maria Caban, Eva Marie Sosa, Migdalia Franklin and Dr. Irma Almirall-Padamsee. The organization was founded upon three principles: La Cultura Latina (the Latino Culture), La Comunidad (the Community), and La Hermandad (the Sisterhood). The founders of Lambda Pi Chi Sorority, Inc. envisioned an organization that would embrace Latina community leaders who wanted to make a positive impact at Cornell and the Latino community at large despite institutional struggles. The sorority was helped heavily in its establishment by the fraternities Lambda Upsilon Lambda and Alpha Phi Alpha (who were also founded at Cornell University) and La Asociacion Latina present on campus.

Lambda Pi Chi Sorority, Inc. was the first Latina sorority incorporated in New York state. During the organization's 2015 National Convention, members voted to become trans-inclusive, the first National Association of Latino Fraternal Organizations (NALFO) sorority to do so.

On March 25, 2017, Lambda Pi Chi Sorority, Inc., established their first chapter at a historically black college and university (HBCU), North Carolina Central University. The Organization is the first Latina-based, and not exclusive, Sorority on the campus, and the second NALFO sorority to establish a chapter at a HBCU.

Philanthropy
Latinas Promoviendo Comunidad/Lambda Pi Chi Sorority Inc. focuses on serving the Latino community with an emphasis on the Latina, communities of color, and members of other underserved communities. To do this, the sorority partakes in two public service projects: L.E.A.A.P: Latinas Educating on AIDS Awareness and Prevention and Proyecto H.A.C.E.R. Hacer in Spanish means to make, to build, to do.

On July 14, 2016, Latinas Promoviendo Comunidad/Lambda Pi Chi Sorority, Inc. announced two scholarship opportunities in honor of deceased Hermanas Fanny D. Carela and Gabby Oberti. The two scholarship opportunities are intended to embody the spirit and passion of the Hermanas and also invest in the advancement and education of La Hermanadad (the Sisterhood) and La Comunidad (the Community).

Chapters
Lambda Pi Chi currently has thirty-one undergraduate chapters and fourteen professional/graduate chapters:

Undergraduate chapters
Alpha chapter— Cornell University / Ithaca College
Beta chapter— Columbia University / City College of New York
Gamma chapter— SUNY Albany
Delta chapter— New York University
Epsilon chapter— American University / Georgetown University
Zeta chapter— Syracuse University
Eta chapter— Wesleyan University
Theta chapter— George Washington University
Iota chapter— University of Massachusetts Amherst / Smith College
Kappa chapter— Duke University
Lambda chapter— University of Rochester / Rochester Institute of Technology
Mu chapter— George Mason University
Nu chapter— Harvard University / Northeastern University / Tufts University
Xi chapter— St. John's University
Omicron chapter— University of Delaware
Pi chapter— Letter reserved for Professional/Graduate chapters.
Rho chapter— North Carolina State University
Sigma chapter— Johns Hopkins University
Tau chapter— Union College
Upsilon chapter— Long Island University C. W. Post Campus
Phi chapter— University of North Carolina at Chapel Hill
Chi chapter— University of Chicago
Psi chapter— St. Thomas Aquinas College
Omega chapter— Reserved for deceased Hermanas
Alpha Alpha chapter— Saint Leo University
Alpha Beta chapter— North Carolina Central University
Alpha Gamma chapter— Davidson College
Alpha Delta chapter— Rutgers University-New Brunswick
Alpha Epsilon chapter— Campbell University
Alpha Zeta chapter— High Point University
Alpha Eta chapter— Western Carolina University
Rhodes College Provisional chapter— Rhodes College
Virginia Tech Provisional chapter— Virginia Tech

Professional and graduate chapters
The sorority allows for graduate chapters for those seeking participation after college, or for alumnae initiates:
Pi Alpha—New York, New York
Pi Beta—Washington, D.C.
Pi Gamma—Miami, Florida
Pi Delta—Upstate New York
Pi Epsilon—Rochester, New York
Pi Zeta—Southern California
Pi Eta—New Jersey
Pi Theta—Boston, Massachusetts
Pi Iota—North Carolina
Pi Kappa—Long Island, New York
Pi Lambda—Houston, Texas
Pi Mu—Central Florida
Pi Nu—Maryland
Pi Xi—Delaware

References

External links
 

Student organizations established in 1988
National Association of Latino Fraternal Organizations
Student societies in the United States
Hispanic and Latino organizations
Latino fraternities and sororities
1988 establishments in New York (state)